Events from the year 1944 in Canada.

Incumbents

Crown 
 Monarch – George VI

Federal government 
 Governor General – Alexander Cambridge, 1st Earl of Athlone
 Prime Minister – William Lyon Mackenzie King
 Chief Justice – Lyman Poore Duff (British Columbia) (until 7 January) then Thibaudeau Rinfret (Quebec) 
 Parliament – 19th

Provincial governments

Lieutenant governors 
Lieutenant Governor of Alberta – John C. Bowen   
Lieutenant Governor of British Columbia – William Culham Woodward 
Lieutenant Governor of Manitoba – Roland Fairbairn McWilliams  
Lieutenant Governor of New Brunswick – William George Clark  
Lieutenant Governor of Nova Scotia – Henry Ernest Kendall 
Lieutenant Governor of Ontario – Albert Edward Matthews 
Lieutenant Governor of Prince Edward Island – Bradford William LePage 
Lieutenant Governor of Quebec – Eugène Fiset 
Lieutenant Governor of Saskatchewan – Archibald Peter McNab

Premiers 
Premier of Alberta – Ernest Manning   
Premier of British Columbia – John Hart  
Premier of Manitoba – Stuart Garson  
Premier of New Brunswick – John McNair 
Premier of Nova Scotia – A.S. MacMillan
Premier of Ontario – George A. Drew 
Premier of Prince Edward Island – J. Walter Jones
Premier of Quebec – Adélard Godbout (until August 30) then Maurice Duplessis 
Premier of Saskatchewan – William John Patterson (until July 10) then Tommy Douglas

Territorial governments

Commissioners 
 Controller of Yukon – George A. Jeckell 
 Commissioner of Northwest Territories – Charles Camsell

Events
Conscription Crisis of 1944
March 20 - Henry Duncan Graham Crerar becomes chief of the Canadian Army
June 6 - World War II: The 3rd Canadian Infantry Division lands at Juno Beach, part of the Invasion of Normandy
June 15 - Saskatchewan election: Tommy Douglas's Co-operative Commonwealth Federation wins a landslide majority, defeating William John Patterson's Liberals
July 10 - Tommy Douglas becomes premier of Saskatchewan, replacing William Patterson
July 23 -  World War II: The First Canadian Army is activated in Normandy, becoming the largest combat force to ever be placed under Canadian command.
August 1 - The House of Commons approves the Family Allowance Act
August 8 - Alberta election: Ernest Manning's Alberta Social Credit Party wins a third consecutive majority
August 17 - World War II: The Canadian Army liberates Falaise
August 30 - Maurice Duplessis becomes Premier of Quebec for the second time, replacing Adélard Godbout
October 1 - World War II: The Battle of the Scheldt estuary begins
October 13 - World War II: 1st Battalion The Black Watch (Royal Highland Regiment) of Canada suffers significant casualties in the action known in regimental lore as Black Friday
October 21 - World War II: Smokey Smith earns the Victoria Cross on the Savio River in Italy.
December 24 - World War II: HMCS Clayoquot sunk off Halifax by

Sports 
April 13 – Montreal Canadiens win their fifth Stanley Cup by defeating the Chicago Black Hawks 4 games to 0. The deciding Game 4 was played at the Montreal Forum 
April 22 – Ontario Hockey Association's Oshawa Generals win their second Memorial Cup by defeating the Western Kootenay Junior Hockey League's Trail Smoke Eaters 4 games to 0. The deciding Game 4 was played at Maple Leaf Gardens in Toronto
November 25 – St. Hyacinthe–Donnacona Navy win their only Grey Cup by defeating the Hamilton Flying Wildcats 7 to 6 in the 32nd Grey Cup played at Civic Stadium

Births

January to June
January 6 - John Efford, politician (d.2022)
February 27 - André Roy, writer
March 15 - Francis Mankiewicz, film director, screenwriter and producer (d.1993)
March 26 - Benjamin Chee Chee, artist (d.1977)
March 29 - Terry Jacks, singer, songwriter, record producer and environmentalist
April 12 - Glen Cummings, politician
May 4 - Fred Stanfield, ice hockey player (d.2021)
May 13 - Brian Fawcett, writer (d.2022)
May 20 - Elinor Caplan, politician and businesswoman
May 28 - Rita MacNeil, singer-songwriter (d.2013)
June 1 - Aileen Carroll, politician
June 8 - Marc Ouellet, cardinal 
June 29 - Bob Kilger, politician
June 29 - Charlie Watt, Senator

July to September
July 5 
 Norma McCormick, politician
 Robbie Robertson, singer-songwriter and guitarist
July 30 - Mendelson Joe, singer-songwriter, guitarist and painter
August 11 - Alexa McDonough, politician (d.2022)
August 18 - David Newman, politician
August 25 - Conrad Black, historian, columnist and publisher, appealing a fraud conviction in the United States
September 1 - Harvey Thomas Strosberg, lawyer and academic
September 3 - Brian Linehan, television host (d.2004)
September 12 - Ron Ward, ice hockey player
September 20 - Phil Fontaine, Aboriginal Canadian leader
September 30 
bpNichol, poet (d.1988)
 Diane Dufresne, singer and painter

October to December

November 17 -Lorne Michaels, television producer, writer and comedian
December 4 - Anna McGarrigle, singer-songwriter
December 12 - Peter Goldring, politician
December 16 - Judy Sgro, politician
December 16 - Mike Radcliffe, politician
December 19 - Zal Yanovsky, rock musician (d.2002)
December 24 - Daniel Johnson, Jr., politician and 25th Premier of Quebec
December 24 - Dan Miller, politician and 32nd Premier of British Columbia

Full date unknown
Jorge Zontal, artist and co-founder of the artistic collective General Idea (b.1994)

Deaths

January to June
January 9 - John Wesley Dafoe, journalist and author (b.1866)

February 6 - Arthur Sauvé, politician (b.1874)
March 9 - Roy Brown, World War I flying ace (b.1893)
March 28 - Stephen Leacock, writer and economist (b.1869)

July to December
July 27 - Clifford William Robinson, lawyer, businessman, politician and 11th Premier of New Brunswick (b.1866)
September 5 - Gustave Biéler, Special Operations Executive agent during World War II (b.1904)
September 9 - John Stuart Foster, physicist (b.1890)
September 14 - John Kenneth Macalister, World War II hero (b.1914)
September 14 - Frank Pickersgill, World War II hero (b.1915)
September 14 - Roméo Sabourin, World War II hero (b.1923)
September 27 - Aimee Semple McPherson, evangelist (b.1890)
October 1 - William Mulock, politician and Minister (b.1844)
November 3 - Jack Miner, conservationist (b.1865)
November 26 - Henry Cockshutt, Lieutenant Governor of Ontario (b.1868)

Historical documents
D-Day maps assure success, as when Regina Rifles land knowing "nearly every foot" of Courseulles before taking it

"Throughout D-day, the assault was pressed forward with considerable success" as three infantry brigades move inland

Film: CBC war correspondent Matthew Halton "reminisces about the liberation of the ancient city of Caen in Normandy"

"The Abortive Thrust Up the Caen–Falaise Road" by Canadians draws in German forces, aiding U.S. breakout from Normandy

War artist in Normandy campaign describes evading friendly flak and enemy mines (plus V-1 attacks)

Men of 1st Canadian Parachute Battalion go on 3-day hunger strike while training in England after D-Day

Battle morale under "terrible strain" as fresh recruits with only 30 days' training go into combat in Netherlands

In September along Adriatic coast, beauty and blood mingle in Italian countryside during battle to take Coriano Ridge

News: Defence minister Ralston resigns; editorial: PM King not disclosing "the facts and the principles" in cabinet's conscription crisis

In "scorching reply" to PM King, Ralston says he was fired and PM not acknowledging urgency of Army manpower crisis

In Commons session arising from cabinet crisis, PM King announces that 16,000 conscripts will be transferred to Europe

"We must finish with Hitler first" - Canadian effort in Pacific war is limited by demands of European campaign

Map: Canadian war effort, including timeline and "Canada's War Development" inset with military and home front statistics

Newsletter: Monthly digest of news about wartime production and needs in Europe and Pacific

Compassionate return, leave and prisoner escort duty are advised for Canadian soldiers with long overseas service

Halifax blood donation advertisement - "Hundreds Of New Blood Donors Needed To Save The Lives Of Our Fighting Men!"

Film: "That They May Live" details blood collection with scenes of blood donation and processing, and serum freezing and delivery to warfront

New Zealand prime minister says postwar promises must surmount those who stand still and look backward or who look forward and stand still

Canadian and U.S. diplomats discuss proposals for new world organization, especially regarding clout of less than great powers

Canadian ambassador says U.S.S.R. will be troublesome, but "will throw its full weight behind the forces working for peace and security"

Magazine for Canadians of various ethnic origins has article titles like "Beyond Race and Nationality" and "'Foreign' Canadians in the Present War"

Young woman survivor describes her cattle car transport from Hungary to arrival at Auschwitz concentration camp

With their properties sold, indications are that Japanese Canadians will not be allowed back to coastal British Columbia

Japanese-Canadian newspaper of Kaslo, B.C. says government intends to disperse Japanese Canadians across Canada after war

Ontario Racial Discrimination Act outlaws signs and symbols (but not stated opinions) that discriminate based on race or creed

Drawing: Toronto streetcar passengers read that Soviets have ended German siege of Leningrad

Garden club president explains lure of suburbs (like his one, Port Credit (Mississauga), Ont.) to gardeners

Fired as army commander, but not yet defence minister, Gen. A.G.L. McNaughton visits his Saskatchewan boyhood home

"We are in another world" - Canadian war artist describes layers of cloud as seen from aircraft

References 

 
Years of the 20th century in Canada
Canada
1944 in North America